Gummer is a surname. Notable people with the surname include:
 Alexandra Gummer (born 1992), Australian soccer player
 Ben Gummer (born 1978), British Conservative Party politician
 Don Gummer (born 1946), American sculptor.
 George Gummer, Welsh rugby league footballer
 Grace Gummer (born 1986), American actress
 Jason Gummer (born 1967), Welsh footballer
 John Gummer, Baron Deben (born 1939), British Conservative Party politician
 Mamie Gummer (born 1983), American actress
 Peter Gummer, Baron Chadlington (born 1942), British businessman
 Scott Gummer, American writer and editor
 Tom Gummer (1894 – 1982), British boxer

See also
 Gummer, subdivision of the municipality of Karneid, South Tyrol, Italy
 Gummer and Ford, architectural firm founded in 1923 in Auckland, New Zealand
 Gummer's How, hill in the southern part of the Lake District, England